A backscratcher (occasionally known as a scratch-back)  is a tool used for relieving an itch in an area that cannot easily be reached just by one's own hands, typically the back.

Composition and variation 
They are generally long, slender, rod-shaped, tools good for scratching one's back, with a knob on one end for holding and a rake-like device, sometimes in the form of a human hand, on the other end to perform the actual scratching. Many others are shaped like horse hooves, claws, or are retractable, to reach further down the back. Though a backscratcher could feasibly be fashioned from most materials, most modern backscratchers are made of plastic, though examples can be found made of wood, whalebone, tortoiseshell, horn, cane, bamboo, ivory, baleen and in some cases in history, narwhal tusks, due to the status afforded by relieving itches with a supposed unicorn horn (an example of conspicuous consumption).

Backscratchers vary in length between 12 and 24 ins. (30–60 cm.).

Backscratchers through history 
The Inuit carved backscratchers from whale teeth. Backscratchers were also observed to have developed separately in many other areas, such as ancient China, where Chinese farmers occasionally used backscratchers as a tool to check livestock for fleas and ticks. In recent history backscratchers were also employed as a kind of rake to keep in order the huge "heads" of powdered hair worn by ladies in the 18th and 19th centuries.

In the past, backscratchers were often highly decorated, and hung from the waist as accessories, with the more elaborate examples being silver-mounted, or in rare instances with an ivory carved hand with rings on its fingers. The scratching hand was sometimes replaced by a rake or a bird's talon. Generally, the hand could represent either a left or right hand, but the Chinese variety usually bore a right hand.

Although not specifically used for only back scratching, young Chiricahua men in training  and women going through a puberty ritual traditionally had to use a ceremonial wooden scratcher made from a fruit bearing tree instead of scratching with their fingernails or hands. Young men who did not use the scratcher for scratching were reported to develop skin that was too soft.

References

External links 

 “The Scratch-Back,” at the end of August 19 in The Book of Days by Robert Chambers.

Chinese inventions
Domestic implements
Hand tools
Traditional medicine